Michael Anthony Moffat (born February 4, 1962) is a Canadian former professional ice hockey goaltender.

Early life 
Moffat was born in Galt, Ontario. In 1982, he played for the Canadian national junior team in the 1982 World Junior Championships and was named the best goaltender of the tournament after leading Canada to the gold medal.

Career 
Moffat played 18 games for the Boston Bruins of the National Hockey League (NHL) between 1982 and 1984. He also played in the American Hockey League (AHL) for the Baltimore Skipjacks, Hershey Bears and Nova Scotia Oilers in a career that lasted from 1982 and 1985.

Moffat retired from professional hockey and later played in an over-40 charity league. He also worked as an external salesman at Rona, Inc. in Toronto.

Career statistics

Regular season and playoffs

International

Awards and honors
 All-Star selection, goaltender, 1982 World Junior Championships

References

External links
 

1962 births
Living people
Baltimore Skipjacks players
Boston Bruins draft picks
Boston Bruins players
Canadian ice hockey goaltenders
Hershey Bears players
Ice hockey people from Ontario
Kingston Canadians players
Nova Scotia Oilers players
Sportspeople from Cambridge, Ontario